Ordtrachia is a genus of air-breathing land snails, terrestrial pulmonate gastropod mollusks in the family Camaenidae.

Species
Species within the genus Ordtrachia include:
 Ordtrachia australis
 Ordtrachia elegans
 Ordtrachia septentrionalis

References

 Nomenclator Zoologicus info

 
Camaenidae
Taxonomy articles created by Polbot